Jazvan (also Romanized as Jazvān) is a village in Kuhin Rural District, in the Central District of Kabudarahang County, Hamadan Province, Iran. At the 2006 census, its population was 633, in 118 families.

References 

Populated places in Kabudarahang County